Ngư Thủy Bắc, formerly known as Ngư Hòa, is a commune (xã) and village in Lệ Thủy District, Quảng Bình Province, Vietnam.

References

Populated places in Quảng Bình province
Communes of Quảng Bình province